Dillwyn is an unincorporated community in Stafford County, Kansas, United States.  It is located southwest of St. John, next to a railroad at NW 10th Rd and NW 70th Ave (N Dillwyn Rd), about 1 mile north of U.S. Route 50 highway.

History
The first post office in Dillwyn was established in 1888, but it was closed permanently by 1927.

References

Further reading

External links
 Stafford County maps: Current, Historic, KDOT

Unincorporated communities in Stafford County, Kansas
Unincorporated communities in Kansas